In condensed matter physics and materials science, an amorphous solid (or non-crystalline solid) is a solid that lacks the long-range order that is characteristic of a crystal. The terms "glass" and "glassy solid" are sometimes used synonymously with amorphous solid; however, these terms refer specifically to amorphous materials that undergo a glass transition. Examples of amorphous solids include glasses, metallic glasses, and certain types of plastics and polymers.

Etymology
The term comes from the Greek a ("without"), and morphé ("shape, form").

Structure

Amorphous materials have an internal structure consisting of interconnected structural blocks that can be similar to the basic structural units found in the corresponding crystalline phase of the same compound. Unlike in crystalline materials, however, no long-range order exists. Amorphous materials therefore cannot be defined by a finite unit cell. Statistical methods, such as the atomic density function and radial distribution function, are more useful in describing the structure of amorphous solids.

Although amorphous materials lack long range order, they exhibit localized order on small length scales. Localized order in amorphous materials can be categorized as short or medium range order. By convention, short range order extends only to the nearest neighbor shell, typically only 1-2 atomic spacings. Medium range order is then defined as the structural organization extending beyond the short range order, usually by 1-2 nm.

Nano-structured materials
Amorphous materials will have some degree of short-range order at the atomic-length scale due to the nature of intermolecular chemical bonding. Furthermore, in very small crystals, short-range order encompasses a large fraction of the atoms; nevertheless, relaxation at the surface, along with interfacial effects, distorts the atomic positions and decreases structural order. Even the most advanced structural characterization techniques, such as X-ray diffraction and transmission electron microscopy, have difficulty distinguishing amorphous and crystalline structures at short-length scales.

Characterization of amorphous solids 

Due to the lack of long-range order, standard crystallographic techniques are often inadequate in determining the structure of amorphous solids. A variety of electron, X-ray, and computation-based techniques have been used to characterize amorphous materials. Multi-modal analysis is very common for amorphous materials.

X-ray and neutron diffraction 
Unlike crystalline materials which exhibit strong Bragg diffraction, the diffraction patterns of amorphous materials are characterized by broad and diffuse peaks. As a result, detailed analysis and complementary techniques are required to extract real space structural information from the diffraction patterns of amorphous materials. It is useful to obtain diffraction data from both X-ray and neutron sources as they have different scattering properties and provide complementary data. Pair distribution function analysis can be performed on diffraction data to determine the probability of finding a pair of atoms separated by a certain distance. Another type of analysis that is done with diffraction data of amorphous materials is radial distribution function analysis, which measures the number of atoms found at varying radial distances away from an arbitrary reference atom. From these techniques, the local order of an amorphous material can be elucidated.

X-ray absorption fine-structure spectroscopy 
X-ray absorption fine-structure spectroscopy is an atomic scale probe making it useful for studying materials lacking in long range order. Spectra obtained using this method provide information on the oxidation state, coordination number, and species surrounding the atom in question as well as the distances at which they are found.

Atomic electron tomography 
The atomic electron tomography technique is performed in transmission electron microscopes capable of reaching sub-Angstrom resolution. A collection of 2D images taken at numerous different tilt angles is acquired from the sample in question, and then used to reconstruct a 3D image. After image acquisition, a significant amount of processing must be done to correct for issues such as drift, noise, and scan distortion. High quality analysis and processing using atomic electron tomography results in a 3D reconstruction of an amorphous material detailing the atomic positions of the different species that are present.

Fluctuation electron microscopy 
Fluctuation electron microscopy is another transmission electron microscopy based technique that is sensitive to the medium range order of amorphous materials. Structural fluctuations arising from different forms of medium range order can be detected with this method. Fluctuation electron microscopy experiments can be done in conventional or scanning transmission electron microscope mode.

Computational techniques 
Simulation and modeling techniques are often combined with experimental methods to characterize structures of amorphous materials. Commonly used computational techniques include density functional theory, molecular dynamics, and reverse Monte Carlo.

Uses and observations

Amorphous thin films
Amorphous phases are important constituents of thin films. Thin films are solid layers of a few nanometres to tens of micrometres thickness that are deposited onto a substrate. So-called structure zone models were developed to describe the microstructure of thin films as a function of the homologous temperature (Th), which is the ratio of deposition temperature to melting temperature. According to these models, a necessary condition for the occurrence of amorphous phases is that (Th) has to be smaller than 0.3. The deposition temperature must be below 30% of the melting temperature.

Superconductivity

Regarding their applications, amorphous metallic layers played an important role in the discovery of superconductivity in amorphous metals made by Buckel and Hilsch. The superconductivity of amorphous metals, including amorphous metallic thin films, is now understood to be due to phonon-mediated Cooper pairing. The role of structural disorder can be rationalized based on the strong-coupling Eliashberg theory of superconductivity.

Thermal protection 
Amorphous solids typically exhibit higher localization of heat carriers compared to crystalline, giving rise to low thermal conductivity. Products for thermal protection, such as thermal barrier coatings and insulation, rely on materials with ultralow thermal conductivity.

Technological uses
Today, optical coatings made from TiO2, SiO2, Ta2O5 etc. (and combinations of these) in most cases consist of amorphous phases of these compounds. Much research is carried out into thin amorphous films as a gas separating membrane layer. The technologically most important thin amorphous film is probably represented by a few nm thin SiO2 layers serving as isolator above the conducting channel of a metal-oxide semiconductor field-effect transistor (MOSFET). Also, hydrogenated amorphous silicon (Si:H) is of technical significance for thin-film solar cells.

Pharmaceutical use
In the pharmaceutical industry, some amorphous drugs have been shown to offer higher bioavailability than their crystalline counterparts as a result of the higher solubility of the amorphous phase. However, certain compounds can undergo precipitation in their amorphous form in vivo, and can then decrease mutual bioavailability if administered together.

In soils
Amorphous materials in soil strongly influence bulk density, aggregate stability, plasticity, and water holding capacity of soils. The low bulk density and high void ratios are mostly due to glass shards and other porous minerals not becoming compacted. Andisol soils contain the highest amounts of amorphous materials.

Phase
The occurrence of amorphous phases turned out to be a phenomenon of particular interest for the studying of thin-film growth. The growth of polycrystalline films is often used and preceded by an initial amorphous layer, the thickness of which may amount to only a few nm. The most investigated example is represented by the unoriented molecules of thin polycrystalline silicon films. Wedge-shaped polycrystals were identified by transmission electron microscopy to grow out of the amorphous phase only after the latter has exceeded a certain thickness, the precise value of which depends on deposition temperature, background pressure, and various other process parameters. The phenomenon has been interpreted in the framework of Ostwald's rule of stages that predicts the formation of phases to proceed with increasing condensation time towards increasing stability.

Notes

References

Further reading

 
Phases of matter
Unsolved problems in physics